Christopher Dahl may refer to:
 Christopher Dahl (administrator) (born 1946), President Emeritus of the State University of New York at Geneseo
 Christopher Dahl (sailor) (1898–1966), Norwegian sailor

See also
Christoffer Dahl